England was represented at the 2010 Commonwealth Games by Commonwealth Games England. The country went by the abbreviation ENG, will use the Cross of St George as its flag and "Jerusalem" as its victory anthem. It had previously used "Land of Hope and Glory" as its anthem at the Commonwealth Games, but decided to change following an "internet poll".

England's delegation is notable for including two Paralympic champions, who qualified to compete in Delhi against fully able-bodied athletes: Danielle Brown, who won a gold medal in archery at the 2008 Summer Paralympics, and Sarah Storey, who won two gold medals in cycling in 2008. They are the first English athletes with disabilities ever to compete in able-bodied events at the Commonwealth Games.

Gold Medalists

| style="text-align:left; vertical-align:top;" |

Silver Medalists

Bronze Medalists

| style="text-align:left; vertical-align:top;" |

See also
 England at the Commonwealth Games
 England at the 2006 Commonwealth Games

References

External links
 Commonwealth Games England – Official website
 Commonwealth Games Info System – Official website

2010
Nations at the 2010 Commonwealth Games
Commonwealth Games